Kurá Hulanda Museum is an anthropological museum in Curaçao. The museum specialises in the Atlantic slave trade, and opened in April 1999.

History
The Kurá Hulanda Museum was an initiative of Jacob Gelt Dekker. In the late 1990s, he was approached by the Government of Curaçao to develop the western quayside in Otrobanda where the slave ships arrived with slaves to be sold at the nearby slave market. Dekker decided to buy the derelict buildings on the quay and market, restore the buildings to their original condition, and open a museum at the site specialising in the Atlantic slave trade.

The museum opened in April 1999. It consists of 15 buildings, displaying the history from the capture in Africa to the relocation in the Americas. It also displays the cultural heritage of the slaves on the culture of Curaçao in particular and the Caribbean in general.

Hotel
Dekker bought most of the buildings on the hillside, and opened the luxury Kurá Hulanda Hotel & Lodge next to the museum. The hotel was declared bankrupt in October 2013. In November 2013, the hotel was sold to GHL Hotels, a Colombian hotel chain.

References

External links
 Official site
 

Anthropology museums
Buildings and structures in Willemstad
Museums in Curaçao
Slavery museums